Joan Rendell MBE (1921 – 4 May 2010) was an English historian, writer (mainly on Cornish subjects), and phillumenist.

Life
Rendell was born in Plymouth, Devon, in 1921. She was the daughter of Gervase Rendell, born 1879 in Eastry, Kent. For most of her life her home was at Werrington, Cornwall.

She was the author of more than 30 books, mainly on Cornish subjects. In September 1980 she was made a Bard of Gorsedh Kernow, taking the name Scryfer Weryn (Writer of Werrington). She was also an avid collector of matchbox covers and had an estimated collection of 300,000. Another interest was corn dolly making, on which she also wrote a book.

Rendell died in a fire at her bungalow in Yeolmbridge, near Launceston, Cornwall, on 4 May 2010.

Awards
Rendell was awarded the MBE in 1958, for raising £100,000 in National Savings stamps. She went on to be national chairman of the National Savings Bank. In 1977 she was awarded the Queen's Silver Jubilee Medal.

Publications (selected)
 Cornwall Strange but True 
 Collecting Matchbox Labels
 The Story of the Bude Canal. Callington: Stannary Press, 1978
 Along the Bude Canal. Bodmin: Bossiney Books, 1979
 Around Bude and Stratton
 Cornwall's Historic Buildings
 The Book of Werrington: a pictorial celebration
 Lundy Island. St Teath: Bossiney Books
 North Cornwall in the Old Days
 Hawker Country. St Teath: Bossiney Books 
 Around Launceston 
 Country Crafts
 Saltash
 Cornish Churches. St Teath: Bossiney Books, 1982
Gateway to Cornwall. St Teath: Bossiney Books

References

External links

 Cornish author dies Westcountry TV report on her death

1921 births
2010 deaths
Writers from Cornwall
English historians
Bards of Gorsedh Kernow
English book and manuscript collectors
Historians of Cornwall
Members of the Order of the British Empire
English women non-fiction writers
British women historians
Writers from Plymouth, Devon